Vilniaus diena is the Lithuanian language newspaper printed in Lithuania’s capital city Vilnius and attributed for the city.

History and profile
Vilniaus diena was owned by the Norwegian media group Orkla until 2006 when the paper was sold to Hermis Capital. It is published by Diena Media News.  The newspaper's circulation exceeds 10 thousand on business days and over 16 thousand on Saturdays.

References

External links
Vilniaus diena web page

Daily newspapers published in Lithuania
Newspapers published in Vilnius